Ernest Milton Parsons (May 19, 1904 – May 15, 1980) was an American character actor. He appeared in more than 160 films and television shows between 1939 and 1978.

In 1927, Parsons performed with The Strolling Players of Boston acting company. On Broadway, he portrayed James Case in Unto the Third (1933), Saul of Tarsus in The Vigil (1948), and Albert Plaschke in Now I Lay Me Down to Sleep (1950).

Selected filmography

 When Tomorrow Comes (1939) - Mr. Henderson, the Organist (uncredited)
 Dad for a Day (1939, Short) - Mr. Kincaid (uncredited)
 Bad Little Angel (1939) - Minister at Station (uncredited)
 Another Thin Man (1939) - Coroner (uncredited)
 Judge Hardy and Son (1939) - Florist (uncredited)
 Alfalfa's Double (1940, Short) - Willoughby
 Edison, the Man (1940) - 'Acid' Graham
 We Who Are Young (1940) - Expectant Father (uncredited)
 Boom Town (1940) - Aldrich's Assistant (uncredited)
 Dr. Kildare Goes Home (1940) - Parkersville Crazy Man (uncredited)
 Sky Murder (1940) - Brock
 Third Finger, Left Hand (1940) - Arcade Photographer (uncredited)
 Who Killed Aunt Maggie? (1940) - Mr. Lloyd
 Behind the News (1940) - Eddie
 Murder Among Friends (1941) - Douglass
 Dead Men Tell (1941) - Gene LaFarge
 Cracked Nuts (1941) - Olson (uncredited)
 Hold That Ghost (1941) - Harry Hoskins (uncredited)
 Dressed to Kill (1941) - Max Allaron
 Dr. Jekyll and Mr. Hyde (1941) - Choir Master (uncredited)
 Man at Large (1941) - Mr. Sartoris
 A Close Call for Ellery Queen (1942) - Rogers' Butler
 Castle in the Desert (1942) - Arthur Fletcher
 Roxie Hart (1942) - Announcer
 The Remarkable Andrew (1942) - Purchase Agent Sam Savage
 My Favorite Blonde (1942) - Mortician
 The Girl from Alaska (1942) - Sanderson
 Fingers at the Window (1942) - Jarvis J. Banhoff - First Axe-Murderer (uncredited)
 The Great Man's Lady (1942) - Foreman (uncredited)
 Mokey (1942) - Mr. Larkspur (uncredited)
 Whispering Ghosts (1942) - Dr. Walter Bascomb
 The Man in the Trunk (1942) - Doctor Pluma
 Who Done It? (1942) - Coroner (uncredited)
 The Hidden Hand (1942) - John Channing
 Life Begins at Eight-Thirty (1942) - Radio Announcer (John's 4th Wife) (uncredited)
 Over My Dead Body (1942) - George Lawrin
 Holy Matrimony (1943) - Clerk (uncredited)
 Sweet Rosie O'Grady (1943) - Madison (uncredited)
 Rationing (1944) - Hank
 The Hitler Gang (1944) - Judge / Teacher (uncredited)
 Gambler's Choice (1944) - John Anderson (uncredited)
 Cry of the Werewolf (1944) - Adamson
 Murder in the Blue Room (1944) - Chauffeur (uncredited)
 Lost in a Harem (1944) - Crystal Gazer
 The Great John L. (1945) - Health Restaurant Waiter (uncredited)
 Murder, He Says (1945) - Hardy Sympathizer (uncredited)
 Anchors Aweigh (1945) - Man with Beard (uncredited)
 Dick Tracy (1945) - Deathridge - the Undertaker
 Leave Her to Heaven (1945) - Medcraft - Mortician (uncredited)
 Dark Alibi (1946) - Johnson
 Bowery Bombshell (1946) - Prof. Schnackenberger
 Rendezvous with Annie (1946) - Expectant Father (uncredited)
 Margie (1946) - Jefferson (uncredited)
 Rolling Home (1946) - Charlie Kane
 The Verdict (1946) - Robertson, Undertaker (uncredited)
 Dick Tracy vs. Cueball (1946) - Higby
 The Mighty McGurk (1947) - Ryan, the Undertaker (uncredited)
 Fall Guy (1947) - Unnamed Patient (uncredited)
 Calcutta (1947) - Desk Clerk (uncredited)
 Blaze of Noon (1947) - Hotel Clerk (uncredited)
 The Crimson Key (1947) - Hackett / Huntley G. Harlow (uncredited)
 They Won't Believe Me (1947) - Court Clerk (uncredited)
 I Wonder Who's Kissing Her Now (1947) - Mr. Fennabeck (uncredited)
 The Secret Life of Walter Mitty (1947) - Butler Tyler
 Gas House Kids in Hollywood (1947) - Prof. Gately Crawford
 Dick Tracy Meets Gruesome (1947) - Dr. A. Tomic
 Bury Me Dead (1947) - Waters, the Butler
 That Hagen Girl (1947) - Al - Station Agent (uncredited)
 The Senator Was Indiscreet (1947) - You Know Who
 The Judge Steps Out (1948) - Superior Court Judge (uncredited)
 The Cobra Strikes (1948) - Mr. Weems, Mortician
 Smart Woman (1948) - Witness (uncredited)
 Secret Service Investigator (1948) - Miller
 Shanghai Chest (1948) - Mr. Grail - Undertaker
 The Walls of Jericho (1948) - Joe (uncredited)
 Big Jack (1949) - Robbed Schoolmaster (uncredited)
 Outcasts of the Trail (1949) - Elias Dunkenscold
 White Heat (1949) - Willie Rolf (uncredited)
 Always Leave Them Laughing (1949) - Tony - Dishwasher (uncredited)
 Dancing in the Dark (1949) - Crossman's Butler (uncredited)
 The Capture (1950) - Thin Man
 The Jackpot (1950) - Piano Player (uncredited)
 Somebody Loves Me (1952) - Doctor (uncredited)
 Last of the Comanches (1953) - Satterlee the Prophet
 Down Three Dark Streets (1954) - Hogarth (uncredited)
 Rogue Cop (1954) - Tucker - Interrogated 'Creep' (uncredited)
 How to Be Very, Very Popular (1955) - Mr. X - Bald Barber
 The King's Thief (1955) - Adam Urich
 Diane (1956) - Suitor (uncredited)
 The Girl Can't Help It (1956) - Broadcasting Manager (uncredited)
 The Monster That Challenged the World (1957) - Lewis Clark Dobbs (uncredited)
 Bells Are Ringing (1960) - Pedestrian Next to Barney Lampwick (uncredited)
 Elmer Gantry (1930) - Revivalist (uncredited)
 The Silent Call (1961) - Mohammed
 The Two Little Bears (1961) - Dr. Fredricks
 The Notorious Landlady (1962) - Mysterious Man (uncredited)
 The Music Man (1962) - Farmer - Iowa Stubborn (uncredited)
 The Haunted Palace (1963) - Jabez Hutchinson
 Marnie (1964) - Bald Man (uncredited)
 The Scorpio Letters (1967) - Mr. Atkinson
 2000 Years Later (1969) - Man wearing Bowler Hat in TV Control Room
 The Ghost and Mrs. Muir (1970, TV Series) - Reverend Farley
 The Brady Bunch (1972, “Power of the Press”) - Mr. Price
 Dirty O'Neil (1974) - Police Chief

References

External links

1904 births
1980 deaths
20th-century American male actors
American male film actors
American male television actors
Male actors from Massachusetts
People from Gloucester, Massachusetts
American male stage actors